Miguel Camberos (18 June 1905 – 19 May 1992) was a Mexican athlete. He competed in the men's javelin throw at the 1932 Summer Olympics.

References

1905 births
1992 deaths
Athletes (track and field) at the 1932 Summer Olympics
Mexican male javelin throwers
Olympic athletes of Mexico
Sportspeople from Sinaloa